Egill Skúli Ingibergsson (23 March 1926 – 22 December 2021) was an Icelandic electrical engineer and the Mayor of Reykjavík from 1978 to 1982.

Death
Egill died on 22 December 2021, at the age of 95, at Landspítalinn's palliative care unit in Kópavogur.

References

1926 births
2021 deaths
Egill Skuli Ingibergsson
Egill Skuli Ingibergsson
Egill Skuli Ingibergsson
Egill Skuli Ingibergsson